Leave Your Mind Behind is an album by the Joe Roccisano Orchestra which was released on Orrin Keepnews' Landmark label in 1995.

Reception

The AllMusic review by Alex Henderson stated "Joe Roccisano was never a huge name in the jazz world, nor was he ever an innovator. He was, however, a hard-swinging saxman who had no problem leading a big band. One of Roccisano's big-band recordings came in 1994 when he did all of the arranging and conducting on Leave Your Mind Behind. There aren't a lot of surprises on this hard bop CD, and the charts are pretty conventional. Still, it's enjoyable and honest. ... the album plays it safe and does so with decent, if unremarkable, results".

Track listing
All compositions by Joe Roccisano except where noted
 "The Fax of Life" – 6:24
 "Quill" (Phil Woods) – 6:56
 "'Round Midnight" (Thelonious Monk, Cootie Williams, Bernie Hanighen) – 7:11
 "The Goodbye Look" (Donald Fagen) – 5:05
 "It Seem Like Yesterday" – 6:10
 "Throw Back the Little Ones" (Walter Becker, Fagen) – 6:29
 "Changes" – 6:06
 "Avarice" – 4:29
 "Take Five" (Paul Desmond) – 4:11
 "Leave Your Mind Behind" – 6:41
 "Medley: Adiós Nonino/La Muerta del Angel" (Astor Piazzolla) – 7:56

Personnel
Joe Roccisano - alto saxophone, soprano saxophone, Yamaha WX 11, arranger, conductor
 Bob Millikan – lead trumpet, flugelhorn 
Greg Gisbert, Tony Kadleck – trumpet, flugelhorn
Jim Pugh – trombone 
David Taylor – bass trombone
Lou Marini – alto saxophone, soprano saxophone, flute
Scott Robinson – tenor saxophone, soprano saxophone, flute, clarinet
Tim Ries – tenor saxophone, soprano saxophone, flute
Jack Stuckey – baritone saxophone, bass clarinet
Bill Charlap – piano
Doug Weiss – bass 
Terry Clarke – drums
John Kaye – percussion

References

Landmark Records albums
Joe Roccisano albums
1995 albums